Josh Boateng (born 28 March 1997) is a Grenadian shot put and discus thrower. He is the Grenadian national record holder in both events and the national junior record holder in the discus.

College career

2018 
On 20 January 2018, Boateng broke the national record (Indoor) Shot Put throw of 16.77m at the Pima Aztec Indoor Invitational in Tucson, Arizona. On 24 March 2018 he reset the Outdoor Shot Put Record with a throw of 17.78m at the UTEP Springtime Invitational. He further improved on the Shot Put record on 3 May at the NJCAA Region I Track & Field Championships in Mesa, Arizona with a throw of 18.08m. He further went on to increase to 18.11m in a second-place finish at the NJCAA Division I Outdoor Championships and won the discus competition with a throw of 55.97m.

2019 
Boateng began his 2019 season representing Texas A&M University-Commerce at the Pittsburg State Invitational on 26 January. His 17.41m throw served as both a new school record as well as a Grenadian Indoor Record. He went on to improve on those records with a 17.77 throw at the Gorilla Classic on 9 February. He went on to win the Lone Star Conference Indoor Championships at Texas Tech University on February 17 with a 17.69m performance at Shot Put.

On March 29 at the Texas Relays, Boateng equalled his own National Record in the Shot Put. He also had a 56.80m performance in the Discus. As a result of these performances he was to be named Lone Star Conference Athlete of the Week for the second time. The following week Boateng claimed the National Discus Record with a throw of 59.37 thus breaking the 15-year-old record. He earn a third consecutive Lone Star Conference co-Field Athlete of the Week nod for his efforts. On 11 April at the East Texas Invitational he further extended his National Record to 60.77m, breaking a 36-year-old school record. He received his fourth consecutive selection as athlete of the week in the Lonestar Conference.
On April 25, 2019, at Abilene Christian University's Oliver Jackson Twilight, Boateng extended his National and School Record in the Discus Throw to 61m. He first Athlete from his school to ever go over 200 feet at 61.00 meters (200-1), notching the fourth-longest throw in Division II history. Following this performance he was named USTFCCCA Division II athlete of the week He went on to be named USTFCCCA South Central Region Field Athlete of the Year.

2020 
Boateng opened his 2020 campaign at the Corky Classic hosted by Texas Tech. He earned a provisional mark in the men's shot put at 16.50 meters (54-1 ¾) on his first throw of the season, ranking 17th in the nation.

Competition record
All information taken from World Athletics profile.

References

External links
 
 
 
 Texas A&M–Commerce Lions bio
 
 

1993 births
Living people
Grenadian male discus throwers
Athletes (track and field) at the 2014 Summer Youth Olympics
People from St. George's, Grenada
Pan American Games competitors for Grenada
Athletes (track and field) at the 2019 Pan American Games
Texas A&M–Commerce Lions
College men's track and field athletes in the United States